The 1994 Nordic Figure Skating Championships were held from February 15th through 17th, 1994 in Helsinki, Finland. The competition was open to elite figure skaters from Nordic countries. Skaters competed in two disciplines, men's singles and ladies' singles, across two levels: senior (Olympic-level) and junior.

Senior results

Men

Ladies

Junior results

Men

Ladies

References

Nordic Figure Skating Championships, 1994
Nordic Figure Skating Championships, 1994
Nordic Figure Skating Championships
International figure skating competitions hosted by Finland
International sports competitions in Helsinki